Thomas Daly (1847 – 23 September 1887) was an Australian cricketer. He played one first-class match for Tasmania in 1868.

See also
 List of Tasmanian representative cricketers

References

External links
 

1847 births
1887 deaths
Australian cricketers
Tasmania cricketers
Cricketers from Tasmania
Place of birth missing